The Midnight Sky is a 2020 American science fiction film directed by George Clooney based on the 2016 novel Good Morning, Midnight by Lily Brooks-Dalton. The script was written by Mark L. Smith. Clooney plays a leading role in his film, as an aging scientist who must venture across the frigid Arctic Circle to warn off a returning interplanetary spaceship following a global catastrophe on Earth. Felicity Jones, David Oyelowo, Tiffany Boone, Demián Bichir, Kyle Chandler, and Caoilinn Springall also star.

The Midnight Sky began a limited theatrical release on December 11, 2020, before being released on Netflix on December 23. It received mixed reviews from critics, but was named one of the ten best films of 2020 by the National Board of Review. At the 93rd Academy Awards, the film was nominated for Best Visual Effects, but lost to Tenet.

Plot
Augustine Lofthouse, a reclusive academic, has devoted his life to finding habitable planets where humanity can expand. In the present day, he meets Jean Sullivan after giving a presentation at a gala and the two form a romantic relationship. After a pregnancy scare, Sullivan leaves him because of his obsession with work and his inability to bond with other human beings. Several years later, when Lofthouse encounters her again, she tells him they have a daughter, whom he chooses not to meet.

Thirty years later, in 2049, an unspecified disaster has wiped out most of the Earth's population and left the surface contaminated with ionizing radiation. Lofthouse, now much older, is the only person inhabiting a large Arctic base. A recent flashback shows him refusing to join the evacuation crew with Mason Mosley, knowing he does not have long to live due to an unidentified serious illness requiring hemodialysis and medical equipment at the base. He searches the base's computer systems for active crewed space missions to warn about the situation on Earth, and finds only one: the interplanetary craft Aether, returning from an exploration of Jupiter's habitable moon K-23, which Lofthouse discovered.

In the meantime, the crew of Aether are unaware of the disaster and believe they have lost contact with Earth due to faulty communications systems. Lofthouse finds his antenna is too weak to contact them, even after calculating them to be in range.

Along with his deteriorating physical health, Lofthouse is experiencing mental blackouts. After a kitchen fire, he suddenly finds a young girl hiding in the kitchen, but she does not speak to him. He tries to contact the other evacuees to get someone to pick her up, but no one responds. The girl draws an iris and Lofthouse infers that this is her name. He grows fond of the girl and takes her with him on a snowmobile to another base farther north, which has a larger, more powerful antenna. En route, in an accident, he loses his dialysis equipment. Arriving at the base, he manages to make contact with Aether, but an asteroid field damages the ship's radar and communication systems.

To repair the damage, mission specialist Sully, currently pregnant, and her partner, Commander Adewole, conduct a spacewalk with flight engineer Maya. They repair the communications and radar, but are caught in the middle of a second asteroid field that fatally injures Maya. Sully reaches out to Lofthouse, who tells her not to return to Earth because of the disaster, but go back to K-23 and start a new life there. Aether's pilot, Tom Mitchell, refuses, but upon discovering his wife's final words and seeing the state of Earth's atmosphere, he understands that it is in the crew's best interests to go back to Jupiter's moon. Still, he decides to use one of the two re-entry vehicles to return to Earth, hoping to find his family who may have been evacuated to temporary safety. Sanchez, who saw Maya as a second daughter, decides to accompany him and bury her body on Earth.

In her final communication with Lofthouse, Sully tells him that he was one of the reasons she joined NASA in the first place. She thanks him, telling him her mother Jean knew him, as he had given her a moon rock, and that her full name is Iris Sullivan. Lofthouse says he already knew her name, making it clear that the young girl he had been seeing was not real. When asked how he ended up at the base from which he contacted Aether, he says he thought he might be able to "help someone" (hinting that the reason that he kept track of Aether's mission was not just because he discovered the moon to which it went, but also because he knew Sully was his daughter and that she was part of that mission). Lofthouse tells Sully he is proud to have finally met her, and Sully describes K-23 to him. Her description transports him there in his imagination and he presumably dies at the radio console. Sully and Adewole are left with nothing but to return to K-23 using a course provided by Lofthouse.

Cast

Production 
The film was announced in June 2019, with George Clooney directing and starring. Netflix would distribute, with filming set to begin in October. Felicity Jones was added to the cast in July. Jones became pregnant sometime after having been cast. Clooney opted to rewrite her character as pregnant versus using a body double. Kyle Chandler and David Oyelowo joined the cast in August. Tiffany Boone and Caoilinn Springall were added in October. In November 2019, Demián Bichir joined the cast of the film. Sophie Rundle, Ethan Peck, Tim Russ and Miriam Shor were announced as being added in January 2020.

Filming began on October 21, 2019 in England, and wrapped in Iceland on February 7, 2020. The scene that takes place in a blizzard was filmed in 50-mile-per-hour (80 km/h) winds with temperatures at 40 °F below zero (–40 °C). Some shooting also took place at La Palma, in the Canary Islands. For his role, Clooney lost 25 pounds (~11.5 kg). Scenes set on Earth and involving Clooney were shot before the end of 2019, while scenes set in space were shot after the production's Christmas break.

The film was shot with Arri Alexa 65 cameras (the digital equivalent of 65mm film) with the intent of screening it in IMAX theatres. Because of the COVID-19 pandemic, this never occurred.

Release
The film had a limited theatrical release on December 11, 2020, and was released digitally on December 23. It was the most-watched film on Netflix over its first five days. The film remained in the top 10 for its first 12 days of release. Netflix later revealed that the film was seen by 72 million households during its first week. In March 2021, Variety reported the film was the most-watched among Netflix's Oscar-nominated titles, and assigned it an "audience appeal score" of 98 out 100.

Reception

Critical response 
The Midnight Sky received some praise for its "ambition and emotional tone," though was compared unfavorably to other science fiction films. 

 

Alonso Duralde of TheWrap wrote "There's a lot that's frustrating about George Clooney's new film The Midnight Sky, from its egregious borrowing from any number of better movies to its pacing issues, but thanks to a few grace notes, its shortcomings are mostly forgivable." Leah Greenblatt of Entertainment Weekly gave the film a B and described it as "a dystopian drama whose fluctuating tone—grim, with flickers of hopeful sentiment—feels almost comfortingly familiar, if a little on the nose for 2020."

The Wall Street Journal reviewer Joe Morganstern gave the film a warm review, but added: "The film isn't perfect. The narrative piles crisis upon crisis, from a fat fire in the observatory kitchen to spectacular repair efforts in space and a startling sequence that involves droplets of blood. The pace, paradoxically, can be awfully slow, but it may seem less so to home viewers with plenty of time and patience; the metabolic rate of motion pictures will be changing in the streaming era, to an extent we can't foresee." Brian Tallerico of RogerEbert.com reviewed the film more harshly and gave it two stars, concluding, "The heart of this movie just isn't there. It's as weightless as space."

Box office 
In the Netherlands, the film ranked 17th in its first weekend, grossing $22,070 from 14 theaters with an average of $1,576 per theater. In South Korea, the film opened 4th, grossing $24,608 from 218 theaters with an average of $112 per screen.

Accolades

References

External links
 
 

2020 films
2020 drama films
2020 science fiction films
2020s dystopian films
2020s English-language films
2020s science fiction drama films
American dystopian films
American post-apocalyptic films
American science fiction drama films
American space adventure films
Anonymous Content films
English-language Netflix original films
Films about astronauts
Films about mental health
Films about scientists
Films based on American novels
Films based on science fiction novels
Films directed by George Clooney
Films produced by George Clooney
Films produced by Grant Heslov
Films scored by Alexandre Desplat
Films set in 2049
Films set in the Arctic
Films set on spacecraft
Films shot at Shepperton Studios
Films shot in Iceland
Films shot in London
Films shot in the Canary Islands
Productions using StageCraft
Smokehouse Pictures films
Films shot at Pinewood Studios
2020s American films